Clear Lake is a lake in Deuel County, in the U.S. state of South Dakota.

Clear Lake was named on account of its exceptionally clear water.

See also
List of lakes in South Dakota

References

Lakes of South Dakota
Lakes of Deuel County, South Dakota